Charles-Édouard Russo (born 5 August 1980) is a French professional golfer who plays on the European Tour.

Career
Russo turned professional in 2003, and begun playing on the second-tier Challenge Tour in 2008, finishing 109th in the season-end rankings. He improved considerably to 48th in 2009, and further improved in 2010, recording his best result to date with a runner-up finish in the Allianz Golf Open du Grand Toulouse, and just missing out on a European Tour card by finishing 24th in the standings. In 2011 he recorded two further runner-up finishes on his way to 17th in the standings, which earned him a 2012 European Tour card.

Professional wins (2)

Alps Tour wins (2)

Playoff record
Challenge Tour playoff record (0–1)

See also
2011 Challenge Tour graduates

References

External links

French male golfers
European Tour golfers
Golfers from Paris
1980 births
Living people